The 2006 Boxing World Cup was held in Baku, Azerbaijan from October 15 to October 22.

Preliminaries

Pool A
 
 
 
 

Preliminary round standings

Pool B
 
 
 
 

Preliminary round standings

Final

 Ukraine and Azerbaijan shared the third place.

References

External links
 Results written at a forum (Russian)
 The announcement about the start of the event (Russian)
 Final results and fights (Russian)

Boxing World Cup
World Cup
Boxing World Cup
International boxing competitions hosted by Azerbaijan
Sports competitions in Baku
October 2006 sports events in Asia